TV Brasília is a Brazilian television station based in Brasília, Distrito Federal. It operates on channel 6.1 (28 digital UHF) and is affiliated with RedeTV!. It was founded on April 21, 1960 of present by Assis Chateaubriand, on the same day as the inauguration of Brasília, and currently half of its shares belong to the Diários Associados and the other half to the Paulo Octávio Organizations. Its studios are located in the headquarters of the newspaper Correio Braziliense, where Diários Associados' graphic designers are located. Its transmitters are located in the digital TV tower in Brasília, in the administrative region of Lago Norte. It is the oldest inland broadcaster in the country and is considered RedeTV's most important affiliate.

Beginnings (1960-1972)

While Brasília was being built, the federal government opened a bidding process for three channels, the same tuned from the then-capital Rio de Janeiro: one for the government, one for Pipa Amaral (TV Rio) and another for the Diários Associados. Assis Chateaubriand had promised President Kubitschek to build the Correio Braziliense and TV Brasília facilities in 100 days so they would be ready by the inauguration of the new capital but completed it four days ahead of schedule. The videotape device arrived from the United States on a PanAm cargo plane that landed in Rio de Janeiro; other equipment and employees were provided by TV Itapoan, TV Rádio Clube and TV Piratini.

The opening ceremony was presented by the British socialite Shelagh Parnell at 8 pm on April 20, 1960. João Calmon and Gilberto Chateaubriand also spoke.

TV Brasília officially started April 21, 1960, together with TV Alvorada and TV Nacional.

For the broadcast of the inauguration of the new capital, the Diários Associados decided to link Belo Horizonte to Brasilia, which had twelve microwave towers. There were technical difficulties hence an airplane was used to transmit the broadcast to the affiliate stations. TV Brasília started with a mission to record all the events of the new capital. Initially, Brasilia TV operated on channel 5 until switching in June 1960 to channel 6, where it is today.

TV Brasília produced 62% of the programming, but also aired programs from TV Tupi do Rio and São Paulo along with international programs, but only started to advertise itself as an affiliate in 1973. In 1961, TV Brasília, as well as Alvorada and Nacional, received many requests for mass shutdown due to the conditions of the city at the time. Moacir Ruiz was the first announcer in the city. In the early 1960s, TV Brasília opened a branch in Taguatinga, which would later serve to produce content for remote populations. Early on, the station mostly broadcast in the evenings, but it had a park of technical equipment that included 2 transmitters, making it impossible for the station to go off the air easily. The station also had a  studio that was easily modified and an auditorium with 400 seats.

On August 1, 1961, the program  was launched, the first station's first daytime program. The hosts were Zélia Marcondes and Renée Nunes, who gave tips on decorations, fashions, cuisine, beauty, horoscope and stickers.

On the station's fourth anniversary on April 21, 1964, it launched a new logo, slogan and programming, with more series and fewer films. The rebranding highlighted the Indian logo, this time with a differentiated appearance. In the same year, Tele-Colégio Canal 6 was replaced by TV Escola. All of the station's visual art was based on the capital's monuments, a concept that would be reused 50 years later in 2014. On Sunday, October 4, 1964, TV Brasília launched one of the first educational auditorium programs in the Midwest. Created and presented by Wanderley Mattos,  was a gameshow for elementary school students and had attractions such as prizes.

On January 15, 1966, due to flooding in the state of Guanabara, TV Brasília launched the campaign,  and initiatives to help affected residents. Later, Correio Braziliense and Varig adopted the initiative.

In January 1968, TV Brasília launched the commercial-free Linha Direta. At the request of the artistic director of the time, Emílio Cerri, on June 15, 1968, TV Brasília exhibited Elis Especial, which featured singer Elis Regina performing for the benefit of the Festa dos Estados.

Formation of the Tupi Network (1972-1980)

In September 1972, the broadcaster was the first in the Federal District to broadcast in color. Two years later, TV Brasília aired the Miss Brazil contest.

Until 1980, it was part of the Tupi Network and one of the few that escaped the disqualification granted by the military dictatorship at the Tupi stations in São Paulo, Rio de Janeiro, Belém, Belo Horizonte, Fortaleza, Porto Alegre and Recife. The station belonged to several people linked to the Diários Associados. During this period, it produced the children's program Carrossel in collaboration with TV Goyá de Goiânia.

After the closure of the Tupi Network, along with other affiliates, it began to air REI programming, led by TV Record and TVS do Rio.

TV Brasília after Tupi (1980-1993)

In August 1980, the program Brasília Urgente premiered. It was the highest-viewed program from 1980 to 1987 in the federal capital. Several journalists made their debuts during this time, including Ana Paula Padrão, Giuliana Morrone, and Márcia Witczak.

With the emergence of SBT, TV Brasília became one of its main affiliates from 1981 until 1985, when the São Paulo broadcaster obtained a concession for channel 12. TV Brasília joined the former Rede Manchete, becoming its main affiliate in 1985.

In 1989, there was a fire at the station's headquarters and, as a result, a large part of its collection was lost.

From 1991 until 2003 the station was headquartered in the graphic industry sector of the annex building of Correio Braziliense, headquarters of the Diários Associados in Brasília. It produced network news such as Brasil 7:30 (later Telemanhã) in addition to Telemanchete, a local news program.

New phase of Associates in Brasília (1993-1997)

In 1993, together with the rest of the Diários Associados in Brasília, TV Brasília was also standardized visually.

In 1994, for the first time in the broadcaster's history, the World Cup was not shown per Rede Manchete's decision.

In November 1995, the broadcaster was sold to then-Minister of Agriculture and owner of Banco Bamerindus, José Eduardo de Andrade Vieira, who had a 49% stake in Central Nacional de Televisão (CNT). He then sold his share of CNT and TV Brasília returned to the Diários Associados. The partnership lasted until 1999 following the bankruptcy of Rede Manchete. TV Brasília transitioned to TV!, then RedeTV! until June 2003.

Attempted revitalization and crisis (1997-2001)

At the beginning of 1997, TV Brasília launched a new image. Programs such as Repórter da Cidade (later Brasilia News) and Telemanhã were made more dynamic and popular programs with audience participation were launched, such as BSB Radical and Cor da Cidade. According to Folha de São Paulo, in 1995 TV Brasília was in 4th position among viewers in the Federal District.

In early 1999, TV Brasília was affected by the TV Manchete crisis, which had been sold to Renascer em Cristo, causing its local programming to be reduced and occupied by independent programs. With the launch of RedeTV !, TV Brasília changed the format, graphics and scenery of its programs. The change soon brought positive results, however, the economic situation in which the Diários Associados found themselves soon intensified and the station was forced to end its local programming.

Paulo Octávio Phase (2001-2008)

On June 21, 2001, the station was purchased by politician and businessman Paulo Octávio. Negotiation at the time was possible because the broadcaster was one of the few active vehicles of the Diários Associados that was freed from the judicial blockade brought by Gilberto Chateaubriand. At the time, it had 15 employees and did not run any of its own programs. The second half of that year was dedicated to enabling the company to face its future challenges. Little by little new programs were introduced and the first one was Agenda Brasília, an interview program and focused on general issues that debuted on September 10, some time later the program went to the end of the morning. The program was presented by Adeline Delgado and remained on the air until the beginning of 2003. The Employment and Education program was launched on December 4, 2001, where Paulo Octávio talked with businessmen in the capital. On April 27, 2002, Oficina Mix premiered, a program that was less than a year on the air and was presented by Carolina Monte Rosa. Oficina Mix brought interviews, musicals and varied reports. Journalism returned in April of the same year with Canal 6 Notícias, presented by journalist Sandra Amaral, who presented the newscast on its feet, without any stands. Before in January, Barra Pesada was shown again after a year off the air and in the same year TV Brasília launched Auto Giro, which became a successful format on the station for 12 years in a row, and being the only electronic magazine in the automobile sector of the Federal District to the present day, being called Vrum.

On the night of the counting of the second round of the 2002 elections, the broadcaster was the only one to follow, with information in real time, the course of the dispute between the two main candidates for the government of the Federal District. It combined interviews with accurate information. Only this program, live, with intense participation from viewers, remained on the air for eight consecutive hours, resulting in audience records and high approval by the public.

In June 2003, surprising the advertising market, the broadcaster left RedeTV !, and became the first affiliate of the recently created Rede 21 of Grupo Bandeirantes de Comunicação, until then focused only on Greater São Paulo. The partnership resulted in a more qualified schedule, but with less commercial return. The purpose of television was to become a reference in local journalism, seeking to be the vehicle of the Brasiliense par excellence, in this way, four daily news programs were shown. O Wake up Brasília, at 8:00 am Jornalocal - 1st Edition, at 12:30 pm Jornalocal at 7:00 pm and Jornalocal - Night Edition at 1:30 am. In addition, the broadcaster worked together with Rede 21, on Jornal 21, a national news program. TV Brasília also showed Manchete da Hora - nine daily inserts with the news that just happened in the capital.

On April 21, 2004, TV Brasília inaugurates its new headquarters in the Northern Hotel Sector in Brasília, which operated until February 2014. Also in that year, the television news Acorda Brasília presented by Camila Bonfim in the mornings and the Conteudo with Arthur Luís, a presenter who years later would return to the station to present Clube TV.

In 2005, TV Brasília started to broadcast live its programming and that of Rede 21 over the internet. In the following year, it follows the change of Rede 21, which changes its name to PlayTV and is managed by Gamecorp, linked to one of the sons of then President Lula, following the return of Rede 21 in 2008. In the first months of 2005, the network ran only five hours of programming, from 7 pm to midnight. Most of the grid was made up of American serials and anime, unlike TV Brasília, in which independent and infomercial programs do not go on the air, as the affiliate puts on local programs, which often led the audience. The year 2005 marked the launch of new programs such as the children's Brasilia Animada presented at the time by Heloísa Bomtempo, the video program Turbinado with Flávia Aleixo and the Session of the Two with films that the public chose in addition to small comments presented by the journalist Sérgio de Sá and later by Márcio Machado. Other programs were launched during the year such as Tempos Modernos, Alta Frequência, a musical presented by Paloma Lopes with concerts by international artists, Art Mix, Vitrine Capital presented by Lana Canepa, Debate Capital with Kido Guerra and the sports A Grande Jogada commanded by Domingos Melo.

On June 5, 2006, it follows the change of Rede 21, which changes its name to PlayTV and is now controlled by Gamecorp. affiliation that lasts until 2007 when it chooses not to follow the PlayTV grid and starts to have its own programming. As of May 7, 2007, when it starts showing a grid with local programs, Terra Viva programs, news editions from the BandNews TV and BandSports channels, keeping only two PlayTV programs on air: O Jornal 10 and O Otacraze block; with this, TV Brasília became an independent broadcaster, that is, without having a defined national programming grid.

The return to the Associated Diaries and RedeTV! (2008-2014)

On January 23, 2008, through TV Alterosa, the Diários Associados acquired 50% share capital of TV Brasília, belonging to the Paulo Octávio Organizations. With the transaction, TV Alterosa came to control the management of the business and the commercial and editorial part of the broadcaster. With the return of TV Brasília to the Diários Associados after seven years, the group completes its media mix in the Federal District, where it already maintains the newspapers Correio Braziliense and Aqui DF, the Correio Web portal, in addition to Rádio Planalto and Clube FM. The return of TV Brasília to the Associates took place based on a strategy, in which the idea was to do in Brasilia the same thing that happened in Minas, with the integration of the group's companies and the communication between TV, radio, internet and the printed newspaper. The negotiation is part of the expansion strategy of the Associates, dedicated to making partnerships and societies in the states where it operates. Luis Eduardo Leão, technical manager of TV Alterosa, assumes the position of superintendent of TV Brasília. The channel continues to belong to the Organizations Paulo Octávio, which hold 50% of the share capital, with the other 50% returning to the Associated Diaries that edit the Correio Braziliense. The sale was signed on the afternoon of January 23, by the representative of Paulo Octavio, Anna Christina Kubitschek Pereira and by the president of the Courier, Álvaro Teixeira da Costa. On May 29, the RedeTV affiliation agreement was signed in the presence of the network's president, Amílcare Jr., the president of the Correio Braziliense, Álvaro Teixeira, and the vice-governor of the DF, Octávio Frias. with TV Brasília, at the headquarters of the Correio Braziliense newspaper. The subscription that took place in the afternoon, was shown in the evening on RedeTV! News and Dynamic Reading. In June 2008, the broadcaster was once again affiliated with RedeTV !, after five years. During this period, RedeTV! was represented by the Brasilian branch of Rede União, on channel 56. After 2006, there was no open signal in the Federal District, with that it was only possible to tune in to RedeTV! pay TV or satellite dish.

On July 8, a party held at the Ilha das Tribos space, in Brasília, officially marked the beginning of the partnership between RedeTV! and TV Brasília, which starts to retransmit RedeTV's signal! at different times. With the new grid, TV Brasília's programming gains national coverage. Brasília, is one of the cities with the worst performance in terms of regionalization of programming, reaching an average of 6.61% according to the study of the Observatory on the Right to Communication (2009). The only broadcaster in the capital that surpassed the national average was TV Brasília, with 11% of local content broadcast. The other broadcasters, affiliated with the four largest networks, maintain much lower rates: RecordTV (8.48%), Globo (5.75%), Band (4.76%) and SBT (3%).

In February 2009, TV Brasília changes its local schedule during prime time and starts showing Notícias das 7, which due to its low audience, would be extinct three months later. In August, the broadcaster starts to show the program Antônio Roberto e Você, which is also shown on TV Alterosa in Minas Gerais, which also belongs to the Diários Associados. At the end of 2009, TV Brasília reformulated the Esporte Show, now presented by Bruno Mendes, and now has greater prominence in football. It used the formula  Democratic Bench  that is used successfully in the programs Alterosa Esporte (on TV Alterosa / SBT in Minas Gerais) and in Superesportes (on TV stations Borborema affiliated by SBT in Campina Grande / PB and TV Clube affiliated by Rede) Record in Recife / PE).

On June 20, 2010, the broadcaster launched the campaign in celebration of fifty years with the slogan A TV that sees the city in its own way.

The capital of the State of Goiás (Goiânia), since July 2011, started to receive the signal from TV Brasilia through channel 21 UHF and also through channel 22 of NET. On November 14, the broadcaster premiered the police program DF Alerta, presented by Fred Linhares, becoming an audience phenomenon, reaching absolute success according to Ibope's assessment.

In September 2013, due to the change in the local schedule in the midday range, the Bola Dividida program started to be shown at 6:00 pm.

New headquarters of TV Brasília and reformulation (since 2014)

On February 17, 2014, TV Brasília launched its new program, with the creation of "Super Local Band", and its studios were again located at the headquarters of the Associated Diaries in the Graphic Industry Sector, being officially opened on April 29. . On February 19, police reporter Raphael Britto of the DF Alerta program died of kidney failure. On March 10, the program Clube TV presented by Arthur Luís from Clube FM premiered, which has community journalism, varieties, presentation by national artists when they are doing shows in the Federal District, raffle tickets for musical shows and exhibition of hit clips of success that play on Rádio Clube FM. With the success of the attraction, the program format was implemented at TV Clube, an affiliate of RecordTV in Recife / PE with the program  Agora é Hora . At the end of November, the broadcaster reached the leadership in audience in the lunch band called Super Local Band with the programs Jornal Local, DF Alerta and Clube TV, thus competing for the audience with TV Globo Brasília, RecordTV Brasília and SBT Brasília in the preference of public.

In 2015, TV Brasília started broadcasting its local programming live via Correio Web and mobile applications. On February 23, the broadcaster extinguished Jornal Local 2nd Edition, and Jornal Local's hours, as well as several others were opened to be occupied by independent programs, this measure came through the repositioning of TV Brasilia in order to encourage third-party content. and regional producers. On August 17, the political talk show CB.Poder premiered, in partnership with the newspaper Correio Braziliense, presented by Simone Souto. On December 20, 2015, the Clube TV program was elected the best local program in Brazil by the website Na Telinha / Uol, surpassing the program A Bahia Que a Gente Likes shown on RecordTV Itapoan.

On January 10, 2016, the program Vrum Brasília premiered, presented by Clayton Sousa. In April, there were changes to the station's "Super Local Track", with the program DF Alerta now showing at 11:45 am (cutting the final 15 minutes of Best for You), and the Local News at 1:10 pm. In July, Clube TV ceased to be shown by the broadcaster, and broadcaster Arthur Luis started to act only at Clube FM and in the artistic management of the radio stations of the Diários Associados in the Federal District. On September 19, the broadcaster relaunched the 2nd edition of Jornal Local, in the presentation by João Fagundes.

In February 2017, DF Alerta will be introduced on an interim basis by reporter Rodrigo Lemes, the day after Fred Linhares was hired by RecordTV Brasília. A month later, Nikole Lima became the new owner of the program, while Wagner Relâmpago went on to make police comments. In March of the following year, the program O Conciliador with Todi Moreno premiered. The program is a simple conflict resolution tool in which the parties seek to resolve their issues with the assistance of the conciliator Todi Moreno (former director of Procon / DF)

On November 14, 2019, the broadcaster signs a contract to broadcast the Candango Football Championship, after ten years. During this vacant time, TV Globo Brasília held the championship rights.

In January 2020, journalist Paula Lobão leaves the station. On February 2, the broadcaster starts broadcasting the National Alert program of TV A Crítica in partnership with RedeTV !, being one of the affiliates with greater participation in the journalistic. and in April of the same year, due to the pandemic of the new coronavirus, TV Brasília chose to show some programs directly from the home of their presenters, such as Vrum, DF Alerta and others. Some presenters recorded videos on the station's social networks, encouraging viewers to comply with social isolation.

On April 21, 2020, Brasilia TV presented a celebration of Pedro Paulo and Matheus in celebration of his sixty years, integrated with the internet and social networks, and on the same day, earlier, a special edition of Jornal Local was shown. in commemoration of the sixtieth anniversary of the broadcaster and the capital. That day there was no exhibition of A Tarde é Sua and the rented time to Universal Church, ending at 6 pm on television for the National Alert but on the social networks of the broadcaster and YouTube followed on the air until 6:30 pm. The 3rd edition of TV Brasília Run, which would take place in May 2020, was canceled due to the pandemic.

On July 13, 2020, Nikole Lima left TV Brasília after signing a contract with RecordTV Brasília. The following day, the journalist Wagner Relâmpago, who was in his home office, took over the presentation of DF Alerta. On June 18, 2020, the journalist Jéssica Nascimento, who worked in the reporting team of Jornal Local, announced the departure of TV Brasília and went on to RecordTV Brasília. On July 21, Rachel Castro who worked in the direction of DF Alerta leaves the station towards SBT Brasília. In August, the journalist Bruno Fonseca (known as Brunoso) is hired to present DF Alerta, after a year on TV A Crítica de Manaus, where he presented the journalist Alerta Nacional. Still in 2020, TV Brasília launches the reality show Os Infiltrados Brasília, being the first reality show to be made in the federal capital and Vrum Brasília, with 4 years on the air, is now called Vrum again, as it was at the time of its passage on Alterosa TV. And still in 2020, TV Brasília ends the production of Momento CBV and Vitrine Gastrô.

In the first quarter of 2021, Chef Vinícius Rossignolli announced that he will switch from TV Brasília to TV Bandeirantes Brasília.

Logo

Initially the station had no logo, while it was tuned to VHF 5, because when changing channels in June 1960 the station started to use its name as a logo, but with the 6 highlighted within a screen. And in 1961, already on Channel 6, he won a version of the Indian TV Tupi differentiated from other affiliates, but in 1962 he started to follow the aesthetic standard of SP.

In 1963 TV Brasília launched a logo under the nomenclature of Channel 6, with the iris of the eye in the shape of 6, it was used in conjunction with that of 1962.

In April 1964, the Indian returned to the main spotlight, but this time with a square and flat face, he remained on the station's facade until 1974. The station's vignettes at that time were set in the monuments of Brasília.

In 1968, TV Brasília improves its Indian child, who now gains body and voice and interacts in the advertising pieces and vignettes of the broadcaster, representing the federal capital.

In 1973 One year after the formation of the Tupi Network, its logo became the same as that of the network, consisting of two interwoven lines and three spheres in colors: blue, red and green that remained until 1977. In 1975 a similar vignette was launched that of the network.

In 1977, the broadcaster used a stylized weathervane as a logo, but due to poor public reception, they soon returned with the 1973 logo, only with the bigger waves and the colors reordered to red, green and blue. In 1978 TV Brasília used the same stylized T from the network, however, inside a screen.

Due to the extinction of the Tupi Television Network, TV Brasília remained without a logo from July 20, 1980 until December 8, 1980.

At the end of 1980, the station won a logo made by Cyro Del Nero, representing the number 6 stylized in RGB colors and with its own typography, inspired by Brasilia's different architecture. In 1985, shortly after the broadcaster joined Rede Manchete, the previous logo gained an alternative version, with rounded ends. It was no longer used after the 1989 fire.

On March 1, 1993, TV Brasília adopted the standard logo of the Diários Associados, which was also used by Rádio Planalto, 105 FM, TV Goiânia and Correio Braziliense at the time.

And on April 20, 1997, in commemoration of 37 years of TV Brasília, a sphere with the map of Brasilia was used, in reference to the name of the broadcaster. Along with the new brand, a new visual identity was adopted, completely redesigned and in line with the trends of the time and the slogan that was used by the broadcaster was "Must see", the vignette of the time showed people opening the camera lens in Brasilia and making a gesture of looking. In December 1999 the logo undergoes subtle updates in its programming and visual identity with the arrival of RedeTV! The logo was maintained until 2002, one year after Paulo Octávio Organizations acquired 100% of the issuer's shares.

In 2002, already belonging to the Paulo Octávio Group, TV Brasília started to use the name "Canal 6" more than its own, in order to signal to the viewer that the company had changed owner and objectives. The number 6 became the symbol as an attempt to become more popular in the market, all programs, brands and its visual identity in general were updated, keeping no memory of the time when it was administered by the Associated Diaries, the logo became a simple 6, changing the traditional blue color to a golden yellow. The solution proved to be precarious because TV Brasília operated on different channels in the most different cities in Brasília.

On June 1, 2003, the broadcaster became the first affiliate of the recently created Rede 21 of Grupo Bandeirantes de Comunicação, and with this new era, a new visual identity was developed, highly contemporary and aligned with the market of the time. The solution, therefore, was to fix TV Brasília and not the channel. Ruth Reis, who was part of Rede Globo's creative teams, accepted the challenge. The spiral that circulates around the force radiating pole. The center that exports information. In other words, TV Brasília and its relationship with the cities of the Federal District. new news, police, sports, entertainment, series and even humorous videos were launched, the visual identity was responsible for Ruth Reis, Toni Lucena and Rubens Duarte, more later for Aguinaldo Abreu and Diego Brandão.

In 2008, TV Brasília partially returned to Diários Associados, and in July of the same year, it became affiliated again with RedeTV !, therefore, in October 2008, the previous logo was updated, gaining a more "flat" and less 3D appearance, seeking to update the market news. In the following year, its programs were visually modified and in April 2010, with the celebration of the 50th anniversary of the channel, a new vignette, a ringing sound and a new slogan was launched: TV that sees the city in its own way.

On February 17, 2014, TV Brasília returns to the headquarters of the Diários Associados in Brasília, launches its new programming, completely redesigned with new studios, sets and equipment, together with the launch of its new logo that alludes to 1997, only that now representing the map of Brasilia through 3 screens with the colors of Brazil that together form the original sketch of Lúcio Costa. An alternative version was also used in the 60s during February to July 2020.

Slogans
Sintonize a TV-Brasília, A melhor programação da nova capital (1960-1961)
A pioneira do Brasil-Central (1961-1963)
Cada Vez Melhor (1963-1965)
Programação de Vanguarda (1965-1968)
O Super Canal 6 (1968)
Cada Dia Melhor (1968-1970)
TV Brasília, a emissora que criou tradição na terra de Niemeyer (1970-1972)
TV Brasília é mais cor em sua vida (1972-1973)
TV Brasília, mais calor humano (1978-1979)
Maior penetração na sua TV (1979)
Mais perto de você (1979-1980)
Com Brasília desde o primeiro dia (1980)
A Marca da Maioridade (1980-1981)
A Televisão que o povo gosta (1984-1985)
A força de quem acredita no trabalho (1991-1993)
TV Brasília, O Canal da Cidade (1993-1997)
TV Brasília, Tem que ver! (1997-1999)
TV Brasília, a TV da Nossa Cidade (1999-2001)
Onde Brasília se Vê (2001-2002)
Canal 6, Ligado por você (2002-2003)
Aqui é o seu lugar (2003-2005)
O Canal que Pega Bem (2005-2008)
TV Brasília & Rede TV! Conteúdo em dobro pra você (2008-2010)
A TV que enxerga a cidade do Seu Jeito (2010-2014)
Amor Federal por Você (2014-2018)
Sintonizada com o futuro (2016)
A TV que é Daqui (2018-)

Special
TV Brasília Canal 6, 4 anos de Pioneirismo (1964)
TV Brasília 20 Anos, com Brasília desde o primeiro dia (1980)
30 Anos Ligada em Você (1990)
Há 40 anos a TV da Nossa Cidade (2000)
45 anos no ar (2005)
Há 50 anos, a TV que enxerga a cidade do seu jeito (2010)
TV Brasília: 54 anos sintonizada com você (2014)
Brasília 55 anos, TV Brasília 55 anos (2015)
Amor Federal, Há 58 anos revelando várias faces de uma só paixão (2018)
Há 60 anos crescendo com Brasília (2020)

Coverage

TV Brasília covers all cities in the Federal District through channel 6.1 (28 UHF), and in the satellite city of Sobradinho through channel 29 UHF, in addition to covering some cities in the state of Goiás, some located in the surroundings of Brasília, (Valparaíso, Alexânia, Águas Lindas de Goiás, Formosa, Planaltina de Goiás, Padre Bernardo, Mimoso de Goiás), (Novo Gama), (Cristalina and Luziânia) and also has a repeater in Goiânia GO in the capital 21 UHF, can also be tuned in Brasília by Claro TV on channel 18, in Goiás by Claro TV on channel 25 and by Vivo TV in DF, Goiás and Entorno on channel 517.

Web
 

Diários Associados
Television stations in Brazil
Mass media in Brasília
1960 establishments in Brazil
Television channels and stations established in 1960
Companies based in Brasília